In the mathematical field of algebraic number theory, the concept of principalization refers to a situation when, given an extension of algebraic number fields, some ideal (or more generally fractional ideal) of the ring of integers of the smaller field isn't principal but its extension to the ring of integers of the larger field is. Its study has  origins in the work of Ernst Kummer on ideal numbers from the 1840s, who in particular proved that for every algebraic number field there exists an extension number field such that all ideals of the ring of integers of the base field (which can always be generated by at most two elements) become principal when extended to the larger field. In 1897 David Hilbert conjectured that the maximal abelian unramified extension of the base field, which was later called the Hilbert class field of the given base field, is such an extension. This conjecture, now known as principal ideal theorem, was proved by Philipp Furtwängler in 1930 after it had been translated from number theory to group theory by Emil Artin in 1929, who made use of his general reciprocity law to establish the reformulation. Since this long desired proof was achieved by means of Artin transfers of non-abelian groups with derived length two, several investigators tried to exploit the theory of such groups further to obtain additional information on the principalization in intermediate fields between the base field and its Hilbert class field. The first contributions in this direction are due to Arnold Scholz and Olga Taussky in 1934, who coined the synonym capitulation for principalization. Another independent access to the principalization problem via Galois cohomology of unit groups is also due to Hilbert and goes back to the chapter on cyclic extensions of number fields of prime degree in his number report, which culminates in the famous Theorem 94.

Extension of classes
Let  be an algebraic number field, called the base field, and let  be a field extension of finite degree. Let  and  denote the ring of integers, the group of nonzero fractional ideals and its subgroup of principal fractional ideals of the fields  respectively. Then the extension map of fractional ideals

is an injective  group homomorphism. Since , this map induces the extension homomorphism of ideal class groups

This phenomenon is described most conveniently by the principalization kernel or capitulation kernel, that is the kernel  of the class extension homomorphism.

Then

Galois extensions of number fields
Let  be a Galois extension of algebraic number fields with Galois group  and let  denote the set of prime ideals of the fields  respectively.

Frobenius automorphism
(If  is ramified then  is only defined and generates  modulo the inertia subgroup

Its Frobenius automorphism is given by

since

In this general situation, the Artin symbol is a mapping

Factorization of prime ideals
Such orbits are in turn in bijection with the double cosets . Let  be a complete system of representatives of these double cosets, thus .

We have

On the other hand, it's , which together gives

Also the prime ideals in  lying over  correspond to the orbits of this action.

Artin's reciprocity law
Now further assume  is an abelian extension, that is,  is an abelian group.

By class field theory,
The Artin symbol

with kernel  (where  means ), called Artin map, which induces isomorphism

of the generalized ideal class group  to the Galois group . This explicit isomorphism is called the Artin reciprocity law or general reciprocity law.

Group-theoretic formulation of the problem
This reciprocity law allowed Artin to translate the general principalization problem for number fields  based on the following scenario from number theory to group theory. Let  be a Galois extension of algebraic number fields with automorphism group . Assume that  is an intermediate field with relative group  and let  be the maximal abelian subextension of  respectively within . Then the corresponding relative groups are the commutator subgroups , resp. . By class field theory, there exist intermediate groups  and  such that the Artin maps establish isomorphisms

The ideal extension homomorphism , the induced Artin transfer  and these Artin maps are connected by the formula

On the one hand, the ideal extension homomorphism  maps the ideal  of the base field  to the extension ideal  in the field , and the Artin map  of the field  maps this product of prime ideals to the product of conjugates of Frobenius automorphisms

where the double coset decomposition and its representatives used here is the same as in the last but one section. On the other hand, the Artin map  of the base field  maps the ideal  to the Frobenius automorphism . Hence the induced Artin transfer maps  to the product

This product expression was the original form of the Artin transfer homomorphism, corresponding to a decomposition of the permutation representation into disjoint cycles.

It follows that there is the class extension homomorphism  and that  and the induced Artin transfer  are connected by the commutative diagram in Figure 1 via the isomorphisms induced by the Artin maps, that is, we have equality of two composita .

Class field tower
More precisely, Furtwängler showed that generally the Artin transfer  from a finite metabelian group  to its derived subgroup  is a trivial homomorphism.

However, the commutative diagram comprises the potential for a lot of more sophisticated applications.

These ideas are explicit in the paper of 1934 by A. Scholz and O. Taussky already. At these early stages, pattern recognition consisted of specifying the annihilator ideals, or symbolic orders, and the Schreier relations of metabelian p-groups and subsequently using a uniqueness theorem on group extensions by O. Schreier.
Nowadays, we use the p-group generation algorithm of M. F. Newman
and E. A. O'Brien
for constructing descendant trees of p-groups and searching patterns, defined by kernels and targets of Artin transfers, among the vertices of these trees.

Galois cohomology
In the chapter on cyclic extensions of number fields of prime degree of his number report from 1897, D. Hilbert
proves a series of crucial theorems which culminate in Theorem 94, the original germ of class field theory. Today, these theorems can be viewed as the beginning of what is now called Galois cohomology. Hilbert considers a finite relative extension  of algebraic number fields with cyclic Galois group  generated by an automorphism  such that  for the relative degree , which is assumed to be an odd prime.

He investigates two endomorphism of the unit group  of the extension field, viewed as a Galois module with respect to the group , briefly a -module. The first endomorphism

is the symbolic exponentiation with the difference , and the second endomorphism

is the algebraic norm mapping, that is the symbolic exponentiation with the trace

In fact, the image of the algebraic norm map is contained in the unit group  of the base field and  coincides with the usual arithmetic (field) norm as the product of all conjugates.

Two important cohomology groups can be defined by means of the kernels and images of these endomorphisms.

However, with the aid of a completely similar construction, the minus first cohomology group  of the -module , the multiplicative group of the superfield , can be defined, and Hilbert shows its triviality  in his famous Theorem 90.

The proof goes as follows: Theorem 92 says there exists unit , then Theorem 90 ensures the existence of a (necessarily non-unit)  such that , i. e., . By multiplying  by proper integer if necessary we may assume that  is an algebraic integer. However, the underlying ideal  of the subfield  cannot be principal. Hence  and thus  for some unit . This would imply the contradiction  because . On the other hand,

thus  is principal in the base field  already.

The reason is Hilbert only considers ramification at finite primes but not at infinite primes (we say that a real infinite prime of  ramifies in  if there exists non-real extension of this prime to ). This doesn't make a difference when  is odd since the extension is then unramified at infinite primes. This condition is equivalent to  being unramified at infinite primes, so Theorem 94 holds for all primes  if we assume that  is unramified everywhere.

Theorem 94 implies the simple inequality  for the order of the principalization kernel of the extension . However an exact formula for the order of this kernel can be derived for cyclic unramified (including infinite primes) extension (not necessarily of prime degree) by means of the Herbrand quotient  of the -module , which is given by

It can be shown that  (without calculating the order of either of the cohomology groups). Since the extension  is unramified, it's  so  . With the aid of K. Iwasawa's isomorphism
, specialized to a cyclic extension with periodic cohomology of length , we obtain

This relation increases the lower bound by the factor , the so-called unit norm index.

History
As mentioned in the lead section, several investigators tried to generalize the Hilbert-Artin-Furtwängler principal ideal theorem of 1930 to questions concerning the principalization in intermediate extensions between the base field and its Hilbert class field. On the one hand, they established general theorems on the principalization over arbitrary number fields, such as Ph. Furtwängler 1932,
O. Taussky 1932,
O. Taussky 1970,
and H. Kisilevsky 1970.
On the other hand, they searched for concrete numerical examples of principalization in unramified cyclic extensions of particular kinds of base fields.

Quadratic fields
The principalization of -classes of imaginary quadratic fields  with -class rank two in unramified cyclic cubic extensions was calculated manually for three discriminants  by A. Scholz and O. Taussky
in 1934. Since these calculations require composition of binary quadratic forms and explicit knowledge of fundamental systems of units in cubic number fields, which was a very difficult task in 1934, the investigations stayed at rest for half a century until F.-P. Heider and B. Schmithals
employed the CDC Cyber 76 computer at the University of Cologne to extend the information concerning principalization to the range  containing  relevant discriminants in 1982,
thereby providing the first analysis of five real quadratic fields.
Two years later, J. R. Brink
computed the principalization types of  complex quadratic fields.
Currently, the most extensive computation of principalization data for all  quadratic fields with discriminants  and -class group of type  is due to D. C. Mayer in 2010,
who used his recently discovered connection between transfer kernels and transfer targets for the design of a new principalization algorithm.

The -principalization in unramified quadratic extensions of imaginary quadratic fields with -class group of type  was studied by H. Kisilevsky in 1976.
Similar investigations of real quadratic fields were carried out by E. Benjamin and C. Snyder in 1995.

Cubic fields
The -principalization in unramified quadratic extensions of cyclic cubic fields with -class group of type  was investigated by A. Derhem in 1988.

Sextic fields

Quartic fields
In 1993, A. Azizi studied the -principalization in unramified quadratic extensions of biquadratic fields of Dirichlet type  with -class group of type . Most recently, in 2014, A. Zekhnini extended the investigations to Dirichlet fields with -class group of type , thus providing the first examples of -principalization in the two layers of unramified quadratic and biquadratic extensions of quartic fields with class groups of -rank three.

See also
Both, the algebraic, group theoretic access to the principalization problem by Hilbert-Artin-Furtwängler and the arithmetic, cohomological access by Hilbert-Herbrand-Iwasawa are also presented in detail in the two bibles of capitulation by J.-F. Jaulent 1988 and by K. Miyake 1989.

Secondary sources

References

Group theory
Class field theory